Isola Peak is a summit in Alberta, Canada.

Isola Peak was so named on account of its isolated location.

References

Two-thousanders of Alberta
Alberta's Rockies